Sigurd Fredrik Osberg (born 31 December 1933) is a retired Norwegian bishop.

He was born in Bergen, took the cand.theol. degree in 1960 and was ordained in 1961. He worked as a chaplain in Ringsaker from 1969 to 1976, as a vicar in Åssiden from 1976 to 1987 and in Høvik from 1987 to 1990. From 1991 to 2002 he served as the bishop of the Diocese of Tunsberg.

References

1933 births
Living people
Clergy from Bergen
Bishops of Tunsberg
20th-century Lutheran bishops